Sacta is a river in Cochabamba Department, Bolivia.

References 

Rivers of Cochabamba Department